Animals is an American animated comedy television series created by Phil Matarese and Mike Luciano.

Series overview

Episodes

Season 1 (2016)

Season 2 (2017)

Season 3 (2018)

References

Animals.